Ágnes Juhász-Balajcza (born 31 December 1952) is a Hungarian volleyball player. She competed in the women's tournament at the 1980 Summer Olympics.

References

1952 births
Living people
Hungarian women's volleyball players
Olympic volleyball players of Hungary
Volleyball players at the 1980 Summer Olympics
Volleyball players from Budapest